Mihaela Buzărnescu was the defending champion, but chose to participate in Nottingham instead.

Mariana Duque Mariño won the title, defeating Irina Bara in the final, 4–6, 7–5, 6–2.

Seeds

Draw

Finals

Top half

Bottom half

References
Main Draw

Hódmezővásárhely Ladies Open - Singles